Laos participated in the 2018 Asian Games in Jakarta and Palembang, Indonesia from 18 August to 2 September 2018. Laos first competed at the Asian Games in 1974 Tehran, and the best achievement was in the last edition of 2014 Incheon, when the country gained a silver, and 2 bronze medals.

Medalists

The following Laos competitors won medals at the Games.

|  style="text-align:left; width:78%; vertical-align:top;"|

|  style="text-align:left; width:22%; vertical-align:top;"|

Competitors 
The following is a list of the number of competitors representing Laos that participated at the Games:

Demonstration events

Archery 

Recurve

Compound

Athletics 

Laos entered four athletes (2 men's and 2 women's) to participate in the athletics competition at the Games.

Baseball

Laos made its Asian Games debut in the sport of baseball.

Roster
The following is the Laos roster for the men's baseball tournament of the 2018 Asian Games.

Round 1

Boxing 

Men

Women

Cycling

Road

Esports (demonstration) 

Arena of Valor and Clash Royale

Football 

Laos were drawn in the group A at the men's football event.

Summary

Men's tournament 

Roster

Group A

Judo 

Laos participated in Judo at the games with 6 athletes.

Men

Women

Karate 

Laos participated in the karate competition at the Games with four athletes (3 men's and 1 women).

Paragliding 

Men

Pencak silat 

Seni

Tanding

Sepak takraw 

Men

Women

Shooting 

Men

Women

Mixed team

Soft tennis

Swimming

Men

Women

Table tennis 

Individual

Team

Taekwondo 

Poomsae

Kyorugi

Weightlifting

Laos competed in weightlifting competition with two athletes (1 men and 1 women).

Men

Women

Wushu 

Sanda

Key: * TV – Technical victory.

References 

Nations at the 2018 Asian Games
2018
Asian Games